The 2013 FIBA Europe Under-18 Championship for Women Division C was the 8th edition of the Division C of the FIBA U18 Women's European Championship, the third tier of the European women's under-18 basketball championship. It was played in Andorra la Vella, Andorra, from 15 to 20 July 2013. Andorra women's national under-18 basketball team won the tournament.

Participating teams

First round

Playoffs

Final standings

References

2013
2013–14 in European women's basketball
FIBA U18
Sports competitions in Andorra la Vella
FIBA